Galymzhan Usserbayev (born 19 December 1988) is a freestyle wrestler from Kazakhstan.

2014 season
He competed at 74 kg freestyle at the 2014 World Wrestling Championships where he won his first match, but lost his second.

2015 season
He won a bronze medal at the 2015 Military World Games.

2016 season
He won the 74 kg freestyle competition at the 2016 Asian Wrestling Olympic Qualification Tournament to earn a birth at the 2016 Olympics. At the Olympics he lost a bronze medal match to Soner Demirtaş.

2021 season

In 2021, he won the gold medal in the 79 kg event at the Matteo Pellicone Ranking Series 2021 held in Rome, Italy.

References

External links
 

1988 births
Living people
Kazakhstani male sport wrestlers
Olympic wrestlers of Kazakhstan
Wrestlers at the 2016 Summer Olympics
21st-century Kazakhstani people
20th-century Kazakhstani people